Kvadrat may refer to:

 Kvadrat (company), a Danish textile design company
 Kvadrat (shopping centre) in Norway
 Kvadrat (film), a documentary feature film about the realities of techno DJing
 2K12 Kub, a missile launcher